The Massif des Calanques is a wild and rugged terrain stretching from the ninth arrondissement of Marseille to the east towards Cassis, spanning 20 km in length and 4 km in width along the coast. Its highest peak is Mont Puget at 565m. The area has been protected by a national park since 2012.

See also
 Calanque

9th arrondissement of Marseille
 
Northeastern Spain and Southern France Mediterranean forests
Rock formations of France
Landforms of Bouches-du-Rhône
Geography of Marseille
Tourist attractions in Bouches-du-Rhône
Landforms of Provence-Alpes-Côte d'Azur